This was a new event in 2013.

Gabriela Dabrowski and Allie Will won the title with a 6–1, 6–2 win over Julia Boserup and Alexandra Mueller.

Seeds

Draw

References
 Draw

South Seas Island Resort Women's Pro Classic - Doubles